Mirel Duka (born 9 January 1991) is an Albanian football player. He plays as a midfielder for Egnatia Rrogozhinë football club in Albania's First Division.

References

External links
 Profile - FSHF

1991 births
Living people
Footballers from Kavajë
Albanian footballers
Association football midfielders
Besa Kavajë players
KS Shkumbini Peqin players
Luftëtari Gjirokastër players
KF Erzeni players
KF Korabi Peshkopi players
FK Tomori Berat players
KS Egnatia Rrogozhinë players
Kategoria e Parë players
Kategoria Superiore players